Stephanie Schriock (born 1973) is an American political strategist and former president of EMILY's List, a position she assumed in 2010.

Early life and education 
Schriock was born in Mankato, MN in 1973. She attended Butte High School. She graduated from Minnesota State University, Mankato in 1995 and did master's work at George Washington University in political management.

Career 
Schriock previously managed the races of Senator Al Franken in 2008 and Senator Jon Tester in 2006.  She was also Finance Director for Howard Dean’s 2004 Presidential campaign. Schriock was elected president of EMILY's List in 2010. EMILY's list is an organization dedicated to recruiting pro-choice Democratic women to run for elected office. Schriock is responsible for leading the organization to its most successful election cycles in its 29-year history in 2012, and raised more than $52 million and elected record numbers of women to the House and Senate.

She currently serves on the Board of Advisors of Let America Vote, an organization founded by former Missouri Secretary of State Jason Kander that aims to end voter suppression.

References

External links

1973 births
American campaign managers
Living people
Minnesota Democrats
Minnesota State University, Mankato alumni
Montana Democrats
People from Butte, Montana
The Graduate School of Political Management alumni